Thailand has had "a long and successful history of health development," according to the World Health Organization. Life expectancy is averaged at seventy years. Non-communicable diseases form the major burden of morbidity and mortality, while infectious diseases including malaria and tuberculosis, as well as traffic accidents, are also important public health issues.

Water and sanitation 
In 2008, 98 percent of the population had access to an improved water source. Ninety-six percent of the population have access to improved sanitation facilities.

Health status
Non-communicable diseases form the major burden of mortality in Thailand, while infectious diseases including malaria and tuberculosis, as well as traffic accidents, are also important public health issues. The mortality rate is 205 per 1,000 adults for those aged between 15 and 59 years. The under-five mortality rate is 14 per 1,000 live births. The maternal mortality ratio is 48 per 100,000 live births (2008).

Years of life lost, distributed by cause, was 24 percent from communicable diseases, 55 percent from non-communicable diseases, and 22 percent from injuries (2008).

Life expectancy 
Life expectancy in Thailand is 71 for males and 78 for females.

Infectious diseases 
Major infectious diseases in Thailand also include bacterial diarrhea, hepatitis, dengue fever, malaria, Japanese encephalitis, rabies, and leptospirosis. The prevalence of tuberculosis is 189 per 100,000 population.

Dengue fever
The first case of dengue fever was recorded in Thailand in 1949. Since then, it has been controlled, but not eradicated. Dengue cases soared in 2019. During the first six months of 2019, 28,785 people contracted dengue fever in Thailand. Forty-three died. The 2019 figures are double the five-year average and exceeds 2018's full-year total of 14,900 infections and 19 deaths. There is no treatment for dengue fever.

HIV/AIDS

Since HIV/AIDS was first reported in Thailand in 1984, 1,115,415 adults had been infected as of 2008, with 585,830 having died since 1984. 532,522 Thais were living with HIV/AIDS in 2008. In 2009 the adult prevalence of HIV was 1.3%. As of 2009, Thailand had the highest prevalence of HIV in Asia.

The government has begun to improve its support to persons with HIV/AIDS and has provided funds to HIV/AIDS support groups. Public programs have begun to alter unsafe behaviour, but discrimination against those infected continues. The government has funded an antiretroviral drug program and, as of September 2006, more than 80,000 HIV/AIDS patients had received such drugs.

The American Centers for Disease Control and Prevention (CDC) conducted a study in partnership with the Thailand Ministry of Public Health to ascertain the effectiveness of providing people who inject drugs illicitly with daily doses of the anti-retroviral drug Tenofovir as a prevention measure. The results of the study were released in mid-June 2013 and revealed a 48.9 percent reduced incidence of the virus among the group of subjects who received the drug, in comparison to the control group who received a placebo. The principal investigator of the study stated in Lancet, "We now know that pre-exposure prophylaxis can be a potentially vital option for HIV prevention in people at very high risk for infection, whether through sexual transmission or injecting drug use."

Leprosy
The prevalence of leprosy (Hansen's disease) in Thailand is declining. Statistics from the Ministry of Public Health's Department of Disease Control indicate that there were 155 new leprosy patients countrywide in 2015, as compared to the 405 new cases found in 2010. Leper colonies are found in Chanthaburi, Nan, Chiang Rai, Maha Sarakham, Surin, Roi Et, Khon Kaen, and Nakhon Si Thammarat.

Malaria
In 2017 there were 11,440 confirmed cases of malaria in Thailand with 11 reported fatalities. The nation has committed to becoming malaria-free by 2024. In 2017, the Health Ministry declared 35 of Thailand's 76 provinces malaria-free. The persistence of malaria in border regions and the increasing drug resistance of new strains jeopardize the achievement of that goal. The WHO hopes to eliminate malaria by 2025.

Nutrition

Food safety
Food safety scares are common to Thailand. Besides, common is microbial contamination of street food left out in the hot sun and dusty roads as well as store food contamination by banned or toxic pesticides and fake food products.

In July 2012 consumer action groups demanded four unlisted toxic pesticides found on common vegetables at levels 100 times the EU guidelines (which are banned in developed countries) be banned. Chemical companies are requesting to add them to the Thai Dangerous Substances Act so they can continue to be used, including on exported mangoes to developed countries which have banned their use. In 2014, Khon Kaen University concluded after a study, that Thailand should ban 155 types of pesticides, with 14 listed as urgent: Carbofuran, Methyl Bromide, Dichlorvos, Lambda-cyhalothrin, Methidathion-methyl, Omethoate, Zeta Cypermethrin, Endosulfan sulfate, Aldicarb, Azinphos-methyl, Chlorpyrifos-ethyl, Methoxychlor and Paraquat.

Sugar and salt consumption
 sugar consumption in Thailand is 28 teaspoons (131 grams) per person per day, four times the World Health Organization (WHO) recommendation. Excessive consumption of sugar leads to obesity, a public health issue. Thailand is number two in ASEAN, behind Malaysia, in the prevalence of obesity. In 2017, Thailand levied an excise tax on sugary drinks to pressure manufacturers to reduce the amount of sugar put in their products. A hike in the tax expected in October 2019.

According to WHO in 2017, Thais consume an average of 10.8 grams of salt per day (over 4,000 milligrams of sodium), a rate more than double the recommended daily intake of salt. The main sources of salt are salt added during cooking, packaged food, and street food. Researchers claim that more than 22 million Thais suffer from salt-related ailments. Each year 20,000 of them die from  related diseases, costing the country losses estimated at 98.9 billion baht a year. Thai health officials are calling for a tax on high-sodium food products to reduce demand.

Antibiotic abuse
A study by the health ministry and Britain's Wellcome Trust released in September 2016 found that an average of two people die every hour from multi-drug resistant bacterial infections in Thailand. That death rate is much higher than in Europe. The improper use of antibiotics for humans and livestock has led to the proliferation of drug-resistant microorganisms, creating new strains of "superbugs" that can be defeated only by "last resort" medicines with toxic side effects. In Thailand, antibiotics are freely available in pharmacies without a prescription and even in convenience stores. Unregulated use of antibiotics on livestock is also problematic. Drug-resistant bacteria spreads through direct contact between humans and farm animals, ingested meat, or the environment. Antibiotics are often used on healthy animals to prevent, rather than treat, illnesses.

In November 2016, Thailand announced its intent to halve antimicrobial-resistant (AMR) infections by 2021, joining the global battle against "superbugs". It aims to reduce the use of antibiotics in humans by 20 percent and in animals by 30 percent. The health minister said that about 88,000 patients develop AMR infections a year. The infections claim at least 38,000 lives in Thailand each year, causing 42 billion baht in economic damage. Without measures to address the issue, he said that the world would enter a "post-antibiotic era" with at least 10 million people around the world dying from AMR by 2050, 4.7 million of them in Asia.

Teen pregnancies
Thailand had 35 cases of teen pregnancies for every 1,000 girls from the ages of 15 to 19 in 2018. Health officials have set a target of 25 cases per 1,000 by 2026.
In 2014, some 334 babies were born daily in Thailand to mothers aged between 15 and 19.

Pollution
The World Bank estimates that deaths in Thailand attributable to air pollution has risen from 31,000 in 1990 to roughly 49,000 in 2013.

See also
 Abortion in Thailand
 Childbirth in Thailand
 Healthcare in Thailand

References